Neville Dawes (16 June 1926 – 13 May 1984) was a novelist and poet born in Nigeria of Jamaican parentage. He was the father of poet and editor Kwame Dawes.

Biography
Neville Augustus Dawes was born in Warri, Nigeria, to Jamaican parents Augustus Dawes (a Baptist missionary and teacher) and his wife Laura, and was raised in rural Jamaica, where the family returned when he was three years old. In 1938 he won a scholarship to Jamaica College and subsequently went to Oriel College, Oxford University, where he read English. After graduating he went to teach at Calabar High School in Kingston, Jamaica. 

Returning to West Africa in 1956, he took up a teaching post at Kumasi Institute of Technology in Ghana. He was subsequently a lecturer in English at the University of Ghana (1960–70). In 1962 he and his Ghanaian wife Sophia, an artist and social worker, had a son Kwame. In 1971 Dawes returned with his family to Jamaica, where he became the executive director of the Institute of Jamaica in Kingston.

He published two novels (The Last Enchantment and Interim) and a poetry collection, as well as short stories and essays, some of which were broadcast on the BBC programme Caribbean Voices. His poetry was also published in Caribbean literary journals, including Bim, and he was one of the editors of Okyeame, journal of the Ghana Society of Writers.

A collection on his work entitled Fugue and Other Writings was published by Peepal Tree Press in 2012, including poems, short stories, autobiographical writing and critical writing.

Bibliography
Poems — In Sepia (1958)
 The Last Enchantment (London: MacGibbon and Kee, 1960; Peepal Tree Press, 2009)
Prolegomena to Caribbean Literature (Kingston: Institute of Jamaica, 1977)
Interim (Kingston: Institute of Jamaica, 1978)
Fugue and Other Writings (Peepal Tree Press, 2012)

Criticism and further reading
Edward Brathwaite, Review of The Last Enchantment, in Bim, vol. 9, no. 33 (July–December 1961), pp. 74–5.
Edward Brathwaite, "Roots", in Bim, vol. 10, no. 37 (July/December 1963), pp. 10–21.
George Lamming, "The Last Enchantment" (review), in Race, vol. 2, no. 2 (May 1961), p. 92.
Basil McFarlane, "Jamaican Novel: A Review of The Last Enchantment", in Jamaica Journal, vol. 9, nos 2 & 3 (1975), pp. 51–2.
Gerald Moore, The Chosen Tongue: English Writing in the Tropical World (1969), Longman.

References

1926 births
1984 deaths
20th-century Jamaican novelists
20th-century Jamaican poets
20th-century male writers
Jamaican male novelists
Jamaican male poets
Nigerian people of Jamaican descent
People from Warri